United Nations Security Council resolution 538, adopted on 18 October 1983, after recalling resolutions 425 (1978), 426 (1978), 508 (1982), 509 (1982) and 520 (1982), as well as studying the report by the Secretary-General on the United Nations Interim Force in Lebanon (UNIFIL), the Council decided to extend the mandate of UNIFIL for a further six months until 19 April 1984.

The Council then requested the Secretary-General to report back on the progress made with regard to the implementation of the resolution.

Resolution 538 was adopted by 13 votes to none, with two abstentions from the People's Republic of Poland and Soviet Union.

See also 
 1982 Lebanon War
 Israeli–Lebanese conflict
 Lebanese Civil War
 List of United Nations Security Council Resolutions 501 to 600 (1982–1987)

References
Text of the Resolution at undocs.org

External links
 

 0538
 0538
Israeli–Lebanese conflict
1983 in Israel
1983 in Lebanon
 0538
October 1983 events